Neil Kobus Maritz (born 22 February 1994) is a South African rugby union player for the  in the Currie Cup and in the Rugby Challenge. He can play as a winger or a centre.

Rugby career

Youth rugby / Sharks XV

Maritz was born in Worcester and attended Paarl Boys' High School, where he played first team rugby in 2012. He was selected in a Western Province Under-18 Elite Squad in 2011 and 2012, but wasn't selected to represent them at any major youth tournaments, such as the Craven Week.

After high school, Maritz moved to Durban to join the  academy.

In 2014, he was included in the  squad that participated in the 2014 Vodacom Cup. In addition to making his debut in the match, but he also scored his first senior try ten minutes into the second half, as his side won the match 46–24.

He failed to contribute any points in a disappointing season for his side, which could win just two matches in the competition to finish outside the play-off spots. The  team had an improved performance in Group A of the 2015 Under-21 Provincial Championship, finishing in third position. Maritz started eight of their matches during the regular season, scoring a try in their match against the Golden Lions and a try and penalty against the s, and also started their semi-final match against , which the team from Bloemfontein won 27–22 to end the Sharks' involvement in the competition.

Maritz represented the Sharks XV for the third consecutive season in 2016 – in the qualification series that replaced the Vodacom Cup – and appeared in eight of their fourteen matches in the competition.

Sharks

Maritz was included in the Sharks squad for the 2016 Currie Cup Premier Division and named in the starting line-up for their opening match of the competition against .

References

South African rugby union players
Living people
1994 births
Rugby union players from Worcester, South Africa
Rugby union centres
Rugby union wings
Sharks (Currie Cup) players
Eastern Province Elephants players
Pumas (Currie Cup) players